The Tent Hills are a ridge in Kings County, California, in the United States.

When viewed from afar, the Tent Hills are said to resemble tents, hence the name.

References

Mountains of Kings County, California
Mountains of Northern California